Potamogeton  vaseyi, common name Vasey's pondweed, is a species of plant found in North America. It is listed as an endangered species in Indiana, Massachusetts, and Pennsylvania, and is listed as threatened in Connecticut, Maine, Michigan, and New Hampshire, and as presumed extirpated in Ohio.

References

Flora of North America
vaseyi